Philippine Science High School - Ilocos Region Campus (PSHS-IRC) is a campus of the Philippine Science High School System, a specialized public high school in the Philippines, and under the Department of Science and Technology (DOST). PSHS-IRC was established in 2003 through the initiative of former Ilocos Sur 1st district Cong. Salacnib Baterina.

Philippine Science High School - Ilocos Region Campus is located at Brgy. Poblacion East, San Ildefonso, Ilocos Sur. It stands on a 5-hectare campus donated by the local government of San Ildefonso.

Level and sections

Grade 7
 Diamond
 Emerald
 Ruby
 Sapphire

Grade 8
 Adelfa
 Camia
 Dahlia
 Sampaguita

Grade 9
 Lithium
 Barium
 Cesium
 Beryllium

Grade 10
 Graviton
 Photon 
 Electron

Grade 11
 Dalton
 Mendel
 Newton

Grade 12
 Alpha
 Delta
 Omega

Electives

References
 The Northern Scholar, June 2004 Edition
 The Northern Scholar, June-December 2007 Edition
 The Northern Scholar, January-March 2008 Edition
 The Northern Scholar, June 2008-January 2009 Edition
 The Northern Scholar, January-March 2009 Edition
 PSHS-IRC Code of Conduct
 Office of the School Registrar
 Office of the CISD Chief
 Office of the SSD Chief

External links
PSHS Ilocos Region Campus official website
 https://www.webcitation.org/query?url=http://www.geocities.com/iiicesium&date=2009-10-26+00:22:40

Philippine Science High School System
Schools in Ilocos Sur